Algona is a city in King County, Washington, United States, and the Seattle metropolitan area, surrounded by the suburbs of Auburn to the north and east, Pacific to the south, and unincorporated King County to the west. The population was 3,290 as of the 2020 census.

Due to Algona's adjacency to the city of Pacific, the two communities are sometimes referred to collectively as Algona-Pacific or Algona/Pacific.

History
The community was originally called "Algoma". (A recording error by postal officials accounts for the error in spelling, which was never corrected.)

Algona was officially incorporated on August 22, 1955.

Events
Every year Algona has a city-run festival called "Algona Days". The event includes an assortment of food vendors, lawn mower racing, small rides, live music and other events.

Geography

Demographics

The typical home for sale in Algona was built in 1981, which is about the same age as the typical home for sale in Washington.

2010 census
As of the census of 2010, there were 3,014 people, 953 households, and 722 families living in the city. The racial makeup of the city was 67.1% White, 3.3% African American, 1.7% Native American, 11.7% Asian, 2.0% Pacific Islander, 7.5% from other races, and 6.8% from two or more races. Hispanic or Latino of any race were 15.9% of the population.

There were 953 households, of which 46.5% had children under the age of 18 living with them, 54.6% were married couples living together, 12.1% had a female householder with no husband present, 9.1% had a male householder with no wife present, and 24.2% were non-families. 17.0% of all households were made up of individuals, and 3.8% had someone living alone who was 65 years of age or older. The average household size was 3.15 and the average family size was 3.49.

The median age in the city was 33.1 years. 28.4% of residents were under the age of 18; 10.4% were between the ages of 18 and 24; 27.2% were from 25 to 44; 27.3% were from 45 to 64; and 6.5% were 65 years of age or older. The gender makeup of the city was 50.8% male and 49.2% female.

2000 census
As of the census of 2000, there were 2,460 people, 845 households, and 643 families living in the city. The population density was 1,827.6 people per square mile (703.6/km). There were 878 housing units at an average density of 652.3 per square mile (251.1/km). The racial makeup of the city was 84.80% White, 1.67% African American, 1.87% Native American, 5.93% Asian, 0.12% Pacific Islander, 2.28% from other races, and 3.33% from two or more races. Hispanic or Latino of any race were 5.98% of the population.

There were 845 households, out of which 43.3% had children under the age of 18 living with them, 56.4% were married couples living together, 11.7% had a female householder with no husband present, and 23.8% were non-families. 18.6% of all households were made up of individuals, and 3.8% had someone living alone who was 65 years of age or older. The average household size was 2.91 and the average family size was 3.29.

In the city the age distribution of the population shows 30.7% under the age of 18, 6.8% from 18 to 24, 36.6% from 25 to 44, 19.6% from 45 to 64, and 6.3% who were 65 years of age or older. The median age was 34 years. For every 100 females, there were 107.6 males. For every 100 females age 18 and over, there were 104.8 males.

The median income for a household in the city was $50,833, and the median income for a family was $52,462. Males had a median income of $40,450 versus $28,370 for females. The per capita income for the city was $19,734. About 3.2% of families and 4.5% of the population were below the poverty line, including 3.7% of those under age 18 and 10.4% of those age 65 or over.

Politics

As of the 2004 presidential election, Algona consists of three voting precincts. All three gave pluralities to Democrat John Kerry, although only one (which consists the southern half of the city) gave him a majority. However, the remaining precinct was sufficiently Democratic to give Kerry a moderate majority overall. The 2004 Presidential results were as follows.
 John F. Kerry (Democrat) – 509 (51.41%)
 George W. Bush (Republican) – 458 (46.26%)
 Ralph Nader (Independent) – 15 (1.52%)
 Other candidates and write-ins – 8 (0.81%)

Economy
Tim's Cascade Snacks is headquartered in Algona and has a processing plant in the city that employs 80 people.

References

External links
 Official website

Cities in King County, Washington
Cities in the Seattle metropolitan area
1955 establishments in Washington (state)
Populated places established in 1955
Cities in Washington (state)